Summer Breeze was a single episode pilot which originally aired in 1987 on the NBC television network.

Summer Breeze centered on the life of newlyweds Michael and Eve Wainwright. The couple were high school sweethearts finding married life difficult when an old flame went out of his way  to make their life miserable in an effort to win the love of Eve, whom he had had a crush on for many years.

Cast
 Michael Wainwright (Michael L. White) – Husband
 Eve Wainwright (Debby Yancey) – Wife
 Amy Dupree (Shawn Weatherly) – Neighbor & lingerie model
 Others
 Chris (Michael Diamond) – Old-flame & friend who secretly has a crush on Eve
 Eric  (Brian Williams) – Friend
 Suzanne (Susan Stafford) – Friend
 Vickie (Renee Clark) – Friend

Episodes
 Pilot

NBC original programming
Television pilots not picked up as a series